Top Model Sverige, season 2 was the second season of the Swedish reality television show in which a number of women compete for the title of Sweden's Next Top Model and a chance to start their career in the modelling industry. The prize also included a feature in Swedish Elle and a contract with NEXT Model Management. The finalists lived and competed in Los Angeles.

Contestants

(ages stated are at start of contest)

Episodes

Episode 1
Original Air Date: January 31, 2012

Episode 2
Original Air Date: January 31, 2012

 Eliminated outside of judging panel: Linnéa Melander
 First call-out: Jamilla Idris
 Bottom two: Ivana Komso & Rebecka Skiöld-Nielsen
 Eliminated: Ivana Komso

Episode 3
Original Air Date: February 7, 2012

 First call-out: Jenny Hammarlund
 Bottom two: Sibel Kara & Sophie Angner
 Eliminated: Sophie Angner

Episode 4
Original Air Date: February 14, 2012

 First call-out: Victoria Eriksson
 Bottom two: Jamilla Idris & Klara Kassman
 Eliminated: Jamilla Idris
 Special guests: Emina Cunmulaj, Luiz Mattos

Episode 5
Original Air Date: February 28, 2012

 Bottom two: Jenny Hammarlund & Victoria Eriksson
 Eliminated: Jenny Hammarlund

Episode 6
Original Air Date: February 28, 2012

 First call-out: Sibel Kara
 Bottom two: Rebecka Skiöld-Nielsen & Victoria Eriksson
 Eliminated: Victoria Eriksson

Episode 7
Original Air Date: March 13, 2012

 First call-out: Klara Kassman
 Bottom two: Alice Herbst & Sibel Kara
 Eliminated: Sibel Kara

Episode 8
Original Air Date: March 20, 2012

 First call-out: Alice Herbst
 Bottom two: Klara Kassman & Nina Strauss
 Eliminated: Nina Strauss
 Special guests: Chris Carmack, Josh Otten, Mini Andén

Episode 9
Original Air Date: March 27, 2012

 First call-out: Alice Herbst
 Bottom two: Klara Kassman & Rebecka Skiöld-Nielsen
 Eliminated: Rebecka Skiöld-Nielsen

Episode 10
Original Air Date: April 3, 2012

This episode was the recap episode, where highlights and never before seen scenes were shown.

Episode 11
Original Air Date: April 10, 2012

 Final two: Alice Herbst & Klara Kassman
 Top Model Sverige: Alice Herbst

Summaries

Call-out order

 The contestant was eliminated outside of judging panel
  The contestant was put through collectively to the next round 
 The contestant was eliminated
 The contestant won the competition

In Episode 2, Linnéa was eliminated after a photo challenge at LAX. Later, Rebecka joined the cast as a wild-card contestant.
In Episode 5, only the bottom two were called forward, putting the other contestants through without a call-out order.
Episode 10 is the recap episode.

Photo Shoot Guide
Episode 2 Photoshoots: LAX Challenge / Celebrities on Hollywood Walk of Fame
Episode 3 Photoshoot: Sexy Spies for Maybelline New York
Episode 4 Photoshoot: Zombies in Morgue
Episode 5 Photoshoot: Nude Mermaids
Episode 6 Photoshoot: Mojave Desert with Animals
Episode 7 Photoshoot: Lars Wallin Gowns on Beach
Episode 8 Photoshoot: Chic Moms w/ a Toddler for Mercedes Benz
Episode 9 Photoshoot: Body Paint for Reebok EasyTone
Episode 11 Photoshoot: Elle Cover

References

Sweden's Next Top Supermodel
2012 Swedish television seasons

it:Sweden's Next Top Model